The N68 road is a national secondary road in Ireland. It runs from Ennis to Kilrush. It is entirely in County Clare.

See also
Roads in Ireland 
Motorways in Ireland
National primary road
Regional road

References
Roads Act 1993 (Classification of National Roads) Order 2006 – Department of Transport

National secondary roads in the Republic of Ireland
Roads in County Clare